Urodacus spinatus is a species of scorpion in the Urodacidae family. It is endemic to Australia, and was first described in 1902 by British zoologist Reginald Innes Pocock.

Description
The species grows to 80–100 mm in length. Colouration is mainly yellow-brown to reddish-brown, with yellowish arms and legs. The male's tail is longer than that of the female.

Distribution and habitat
The species occurs in Queensland.

Behaviour
The scorpions dig spiral burrows up to 1 m deep in hard sandy soils.

References

 

spinatus
Scorpions of Australia
Endemic fauna of Australia
Fauna of Queensland
Animals described in 1902
Taxa named by R. I. Pocock